Steve Baker (born September 5, 1952) is an American former professional Grand Prix motorcycle roadracer. He is notable for being the first American to win a road racing world championship when he won the 1977 Formula 750 title.

Motorcycle racing career
Born in Bellingham, Washington, Baker began his career racing on the dirt track ovals of the Pacific Northwest. He then switched to road racing and began competing in Canada, becoming a three-time Canadian champion. 

In 1976, Baker won the prestigious Imola 200 pre-season race in Europe, then traveled to Great Britain to compete for the North American team in the 1976 Transatlantic Trophy match races. The Transatlantic Trophy match races pitted the best British riders against the top North American road racers on 750cc motorcycles in a six-race series. Baker dominated the series as the top individual points leader with four victories.

He then returned the United States to compete in the AMA Grand National Championship where he earned his first AMA national victory when he won the Loudon Classic. He also won the 250cc support class at the Loudon Classic. He repeated his Loudon victories at the Laguna Seca Raceway, again winning the national and the 250c support race. He then returned to Europe where he won the Mallory Park Race of the Year.

Baker's good results earned him a factory sponsored ride with the Yamaha factory team for the 1977 season. He began the year by winning the prestigious Daytona 200 before traveling to Europe to compete in the world championships. Baker won the 1977 Formula 750 title and finished second to Barry Sheene in the 500cc world championship.

He was released by the Yamaha team after the season and competed in the 1978 championship on a privately supported Suzuki. At the end of that season, Baker suffered a devastating accident at the Mosport circuit in Canada that left him with a broken arm and shattered his left leg. Afterwards, he decided to retire from competitive racing.

After his racing career, Baker purchased a motorcycle dealership in his hometown of Bellingham. He was inducted into the AMA Motorcycle Hall of Fame in 1999.

Motorcycle Grand Prix results 

(key) (Races in bold indicate pole position)

References

External links

 Steve Baker at the Motorcycle Hall of Fame
 Steve Baker interview, American Motorcyclist Magazine, December 1977
 Steve Baker in January 1977 American Motorcyclist Magazine article on European road racing

1952 births
Living people
American motorcycle racers
500cc World Championship riders
AMA Grand National Championship riders
Sportspeople from Bellingham, Washington